Gabriella Teychenné is an English conductor of symphony, opera, and contemporary music.

Early life 

Gabriella Teychenné grew up in Amersham, England, receiving instruction on the violin from the age of 4 and piano from 7, and attending Godstowe School. Her father, Michael Teychenné, was a self-taught musician and conductor who worked for many years with orchestras within and outside of Buckinghamshire. Her mother is of Argentinian birth. She attended Oundle School, where she held academic and music scholarships, followed by the University of Cambridge at Trinity College, where she joined the Human, Social, and Political Science tripos and read political philosophy. She continued her musical education in London at the Royal College of Music, and studied conducting with Leonid Korchmar at the Conservatoire of St Petersburg, and with Paavo Järvi in a masterclass.

Career 

Since 2017, Gabriella Teychenné has frequently been engaged by the London Philharmonic Orchestra as assistant conductor to Vladimir Jurowski and to Edward Gardner, and has also assisted at the Hamburg Staatsoper. Gabriella Teychenné has presented on BBC Radio 3 and is also the subject of an article on the station's web site.

See Also 

 BBC Inside Music: Experience some deep listening with conductor Gabriella Teychenné.
 How to become – and succeed as – a conductor. The British-Argentinian conductor Gabriella Teychenné shared her curiosity about music’s power to communicate with listeners to Radio 3’s Inside Music – here she offers insights on what it’s actually like to stand on a podium and direct groups of seasoned musicians.
 Xenakis: Music & Maths review – visceral intensity takes us beyond theory. 'Exactly the right mix of wildness and virtuosity by BCMG under conductor Gabriella Teychenné'.
 Mozarts Oper «Figaro» feiert Premiere im Luzerner Theater: Die sexuelle Revolution bleibt aus. 'Despite the fun and comedy, this ‘Figaro’ is also an evening of great and intimate feelings. The basis for this is laid by the conductor Gabriella Teychenné at the podium of the Lucerne Symphony Orchestra. She drives the comedic hustle and bustle forward with a bouncy, accented and quick tempi. But she creates a sound of astonishing abundance and warmth, transparency and depth'.

References 

Living people
1993 births
English conductors (music)
Women conductors (music)
Alumni of the Royal College of Music
Alumni_of_Trinity_College,_Cambridge
People educated at Oundle School